The 1947 Sicilian regional election took place on 20 April 1947. They were the first-ever election of the Sicilian Parliament.

The electoral alliance between the Italian Communist Party and the Italian Socialist Party was the most voted list. However, after the election Giuseppe Alessi and, later, Franco Restivo, both Christian Democrats, governed the Region at the head of broad centrist coalitions.

Results
Electoral system: proportional representation with Hare quota

References

Elections in Sicily
1947 elections in Italy
April 1947 events in Europe